Ivane Akhaltiskheli (died 1225) was a Georgian military commander and courtier, of the noble house of Toreli-Akhaltsikheli.

In 1206/1207, Shalva and Ivane Akhaltsikheli, together with Sargis Tmogveli, captured the city of Kars from the Seljuqs, for this he was kindly rewarded by Queen Tamar and was appointed as the governor of the Kars to secure Georgia's frontier boundaries. Along with his brother Ivane participated in battle of Basian (1203) and battle of Garni (1225), where he was killed while retreating to the mountains.

References 

Military personnel from Georgia (country)
Nobility of Georgia (country)
1225 deaths
12th-century people from Georgia (country)
13th-century people from Georgia (country)
Year of birth unknown
People from Akhaltsikhe